is a Japanese manga series written and illustrated by Kōji Murata. It was serialied in Shogakukan's seinen manga magazine Weekly Big Comic Spirits from August 2016 to October 2017, with its chapters collected in five tankōbon volumes.

Publication
Shogakukan collected its chapters in five tankōbon volumes, released from October 28, 2016, to November 30, 2017.

Volume list

References

External links
 

Romantic comedy anime and manga
Seinen manga
Shogakukan manga
Volleyball in anime and manga